The Barrens is a 2012 American horror film written and directed by Darren Lynn Bousman and starring Stephen Moyer and Mia Kirshner.

The film was released under different titles in several European territories: e.g., as Jersey Devil in the German-speaking countries, as The Forest in Belgium and France, and as Devil in the Woods in the United Kingdom, when shown on The Horror Channel in January 2015.

Plot 
Two young campers walk together through the woods, commenting that there are no animals or birds around. They discover a pile of mutilated deer carcasses left on the trail and then are chased by a mutilated deer that drops dead in front of them. Something sounding like a large swarm of birds is heard approaching.

Richard Vineyard, his wife Cynthia, his daughter Sadie, and his young son Danny leave their suburban home for a camping trip. They want to leave civilization behind and bond as a family in the Pine Barrens, a forest in southern New Jersey. On the way to the campsite, they see a mutilated deer crossing the road. They stay in a crowded commercial campsite full of obnoxious campers who are not inclined to abandon civilization: cell phones and loud music abound. While setting up his tent, Richard has a flashback to a traumatic event from his childhood that occurred in the Barrens. Later that evening, when a fellow camper tells a story of the Jersey Devil, the campers pull a prank that scares the Vineyard family. Richard overreacts, much to the embarrassment of the rest of the family.

That night, Richard has a nightmare in which he is being chased through a field by something unseen. He is awakened by Cynthia in the middle of the forest, having actually run from their tent while asleep. He accuses his wife of infidelity; she doesn't understand his suspicion and tries to reassure him. Richard apologizes. Cynthia returns to the tent, and Richard goes for a walk. He sees a deer carcass fall from a tree. Several facts are revealed in conversation the next day. Richard is taking pain medication for a wound received before they left home. Cynthia is his second wife after the loss of Sadie's mother a decade prior.

One of the campers involved in the prank the previous night is missing. Richard, who appears weakened by illness, leads his family deeper into the forest, away from the trails, to a new campsite. While resting, Danny finds the disemboweled corpse of the missing camper but says nothing. Richard begins hallucinating and becomes irritable. They find a campsite containing a decomposed dog, a shredded tent, and furs hanging to dry, but no people. They decide to set up camp there. Richard disposes of the dog, and discovers that another camper, Ryan, has been following them and is communicating secretly with Sadie by cell phone. Richard returns to the campsite and tries to take Sadie's cell phone away.

Cynthia announces that they are going home the next day. That night, Sadie searches for Ryan and is frightened by something in the woods. It is revealed in conversation that Richard killed the family's rabid dog before they left home, because the dog bit him. Richard's mental state deteriorates. Richard sleepwalks again, and awakens surrounded by mist. The Jersey Devil appears behind him. Cynthia gathers the family and they leave immediately, but Danny and Richard get ahead and disappear. Cynthia calls the police, and she and Sadie discover Ryan's disemboweled corpse; Richard's knife is next to the body. They find Danny face down in the river, but are able to resuscitate him.

Richard returns but has a seizure. He attacks Cynthia and breaks her leg. Sadie knocks him unconscious and ties him up. Sadie and Danny leave to find help, leaving the severely injured Cynthia with her hysterical husband. Cynthia passes out from the pain. Richard sees the Jersey Devil again. He breaks free of his bonds. Cynthia knocks her husband out with a rock, but when she checks on him a few minutes later, he has vanished. Cynthia screams as she is suddenly attacked by something unseen.

Sadie and Danny encounter a cougar but are rescued by a hunter. The police find the bodies of the missing campers. The hunter, Sadie, and Danny find Richard and Cynthia. Richard attacks the hunter and acquires his rifle. Richard seemingly turns on his family with the rifle. He sees the Jersey Devil behind them. For the first time, the others see it as well. Richard attempts to shoot it, but he is instead shot by the sheriff who thinks that he is aiming at Sadie. The Jersey Devil attacks, kills the sheriff, and then turns on the Vineyards. A forest ranger witnesses the monster's attack and flees.

Sometime later, Sadie is being interviewed by the authorities before being reunited with her brother. Her story of what she and her brother saw is dismissed as psychological trauma. Afterwards, Sadie joins the ranger and a group of hunters, with the intent on hunting the Jersey Devil down.

Cast

Production 
Darren Lynn Bousman penned the script shortly after finishing Saw II.

Bousman originally intended to shoot the film in the actual Pine Barrens of New Jersey, but filming eventually took place in the Toronto, Ontario area for budgetary reasons with the cast and crew mainly staying in the town of Caledon. Three different forests were used for the woods.

The film was planned to be shot in 20 days. However, two days were lost due to severe rainfall. As some of the actors and crew members had other commitments immediately afterward, it had to be filmed in 18 days instead. All the daylight scenes at the campsite were filmed on a single day.

Home media 

The Barrens was released on Blu-ray, DVD, and digital download on October 9, 2012. Included on the Blu-ray and DVD releases is an audio commentary with director Darren Lynn Bousman and cinematographer Joseph White, as well as a deleted scene which serves as an alternative ending. In this ending, it is revealed that Sadie and Danny survived the attack by the Jersey Devil. As winter sets in, Sadie, Ranger Bob, and several others set off into the barrens, armed to the teeth, to hunt the Jersey Devil. Director Bousman considers this ending not to be canon, joking that those scenes will be "saved for the sequel".

Reception 

Brett Gallman from Oh, the Horror.com called the film "a missed opportunity", criticizing the film's uneven focus, and misleading marketing centering on the Jersey Devil, which was barely acknowledged in the film. In his review of the film, Gallman wrote, "The Barrens is an unfortunate bait and switch that bungles its intriguing setup and degenerates into a muddled, predictable routine."

Dread Central awarded the film a score of two and a half out of five. The reviewer wrote, "Overall, while I have my issues with The Barrens, I can't quite warn anyone away from watching it. It's certainly well made and well acted. And the story is an interesting one, full of twists and turns this reviewer wasn't expecting. If you’re a fan of Bousman's work, this may be worth a look for you, so long as you keep your expectations somewhat low."

See also 
 13th Child
 Carny (2009 film)
 The Last Broadcast (film)

References

External links 
 
 
 Movie & TV Projects: The Barrens at AllStephenMoyer.com
 The Barrens on Facebook

2012 films
Films directed by Darren Lynn Bousman
2012 horror films
American monster movies
2010s monster movies
2010s English-language films
Films set in New Jersey
Films based on urban legends
Films about cryptids
Jersey Devil in fiction
2010s psychological horror films
Backwoods slasher films
Films shot in Toronto
2010s American films